HMAS Warrego (L73/U73), named for the Warrego River, was a  sloop of the Royal Australian Navy (RAN).

Construction
She was laid down by the Cockatoo Island Dockyard at Sydney on 10 May 1939, launched on 10 February 1940, and commissioned into the RAN on 21 August 1940.

Operational history
Warrego served during World War II as an escort and patrol vessel escorting convoys, including the Pensacola Convoy,  in Australian waters and the South-West Pacific. In late January 1942 the ship was assigned to the short lived American-British-Dutch-Australian Command.

By 11:00, the convoy was being shadowed by a Japanese flying boat that dropped some bombs without causing damage before departing. The next morning another shadowing aircraft had taken position and before noon the convoy was attacked by bombers and flying boats in two waves. After the attacks the convoy continued toward Timor for a few hours with Houston launching a scout plane seeking the enemy position. ABDA suspected the presence of Japanese carriers, an imminent invasion of Timor and a support fleet lying in wait and thus ordered the convoy back to Darwin which it reached before noon on 18 February.

Warrego was in Darwin the next day when the Japanese attacked the port and, though with a working party over the side, was one of the ships that got underway to contribute antiaircraft fire to the defense. The day after the attack, Warrego escorted the damaged Swan through Clarence Strait and then resumed antisubmarine patrol off the port.

Warrego was escorting the Dutch ship  to Townsville when both ships were recalled to Port Moresby in order to form a convoy to bring forces to Milne Bay. With , Warrego escorted Karsik and Dutch ship  in the first convoy into Milne Bay on 25 June 1942 with Australian troops, American engineers and supplies for the buildup of that base in preparation for port operations and airfield construction. Warrego, disguised with greenery, stood by as Karsik unloaded supplies at an improvised wharf until both sailed for Australia on 28 June. By 11 July, the sloop was back, escorting the Dutch ship  with Brigadier John Field and the 7th Brigade Group embarked as Milne Force to protect airfields under construction.

The ship earned five battle honours for her wartime service: "Darwin 1942", "Pacific 1941–45", "New Guinea 1942", "Lingayen Gulf 1945", and "Borneo 1945".

Decommissioning and fate
Warrego was sold for scrapping in 1966.

Notes

References
 

 
 

 
Warships of Australia, Ross Gillett, Illustrations Colin Graham, Rigby Limited, 1977,

External links

HMAS Warrego (II) RAN Ship Histories

Grimsby-class sloops of the Royal Australian Navy
1940 ships